The Uyandina is a river in Yakutia, Russia, a tributary of the Indigirka.

Course
After flowing in a roughly southern direction in its upper course, the Uyandina flows then eastwards through the Aby Lowland. Finally it meets the left bank of the Indigirka  from its mouth.

The Uyandina freezes up in October and remains icebound until late May or early June.

Tributaries

See also
List of rivers of Russia

References

Rivers of the Sakha Republic